Stage Struck is 1936 American musical film directed by Busby Berkeley and starring Dick Powell, Joan Blondell and Warren William.

The film's sets were designed by the art director Robert M. Haas.

Plot summary

Cast
 Dick Powell as George Randall  
 Joan Blondell as Peggy Revere  
 Warren William as Fred Harris  
 Frank McHugh as Sid  
 The Yacht Club Boys as Singing Quartette  
 Jeanne Madden as Ruth Williams  
 Carol Hughes as Gracie  
 Craig Reynolds as Gilmore Frost  
 Hobart Cavanaugh as Wayne  
 Johnny Arthur as Oscar Freud  
 Spring Byington as Mrs. Randall  
 Thomas Pogue as Dr. Stanley  
 Andrew Tombes as Burns Heywood  
 Lulu McConnell as Toots O'Connor  
 Val Stanton as Cooper  
 Ernie Stanton as Marley  
 Edward Gargan as Rordan  
 Eddy Chandler as Heney   
 Libby Taylor as Yvonne  
 Mary Gordon as Mrs. Cassidy

References

Bibliography
 Daniel Bubbeo. The Women of Warner Brothers. McFarland, 2001.

External links
 
 
 
 

1936 films
1936 musical films
American black-and-white films
American musical films
Films about musical theatre
Films directed by Busby Berkeley
Warner Bros. films
Films scored by Heinz Roemheld
Films with screenplays by Robert Lord (screenwriter)
Films produced by Robert Lord (screenwriter)
Films produced by Hal B. Wallis
1930s English-language films
1930s American films